Rozdolne Raion is, de facto, one of the 25 regions of the Republic of Crimea within the Russian Federation, though the territory is recognized by a majority of countries as part of Ukraine as the Autonomous Republic of Crimea. Its administrative center is the urban-type settlement of Rozdolne. Population:

References

Raions of Crimea